Jephte or Historia di Jephte is an important exemplar of the mid-17th-century Historia Sacra form composed by Giacomo Carissimi around 1650 (probably 1648), based on the story of Jephtha in the Old Testament Book of Judges. The work follows what is considered the classic early Baroque oratorio form with a Biblical text related by soloists and chorus linked by a narrator. The only known contemporaneous score is for organ continuo alone though this is sometimes augmented in performance by violins and string bass, for which some support exists in other works by the composer.

A 1976 version exists arranged by Hans Werner Henze for 7 solo voices, 6 part chorus, flutes, percussion and plucked strings.

See also
 Jephtha (Handel)

References

 A History of the Oratorio, vol. 1, Howard E. Smither, 1977
 The Concise Oxford Dictionary of Music, 1996,
 Concise History of Western Music, ch. 9
 Performance practice: a dictionary-guide for musicians, Roland John Jackson, p67
 "Two problems in Carissimi's oratorio Jephte", Janet Beat, Music Review 34 (1973) 339-43
 Carissimi's Tonal System and the Function of Transposition in the Expansion of Tonality, Beverly Stein, The Journal of Musicology, Vol. 19, No. 2 (Spring, 2002), pp. 264–305

Oratorios